Abu Direh (also Romanized as Abū Dīreh; also known as ‘Ali Dāhir and ‘Alī Z̧āher) is a village in Minubar Rural District, Arvandkenar District, Abadan County, Khuzestan Province, Iran. At the 2006 census, its population was 1,626, in 294 families.

References 

Populated places in Abadan County